The 1986–87 Elitserien season was the 12th season of the Elitserien, the top level of ice hockey in Sweden. 10 teams participated in the league, and IF Bjorkloven won the championship.

Standings

Playoffs

External links
 Swedish Hockey League official site

Swe
1986–87 in Swedish ice hockey
Swedish Hockey League seasons